Feather Finger is a 1966 Warner Bros. Merrie Melodies cartoon directed by Robert McKimson. The short was released on August 20, 1966, and stars Daffy Duck and Speedy Gonzales.

Plot
The story takes place in a town called Hangtree, Texas. Daffy Duck is poor and begging for charity when he sees a notice that Mayor Katt is hiring gunslingers for $15 per week. After speaking to the mayor, Daffy agrees to catch Speedy Gonzales, "the fastest mouse in all Mexico."

While waiting by the United States/Mexican border for Speedy, Daffy decides to practice his gunslinging, and accidentally shoots himself. Speedy comes across him, and he shoots him; Speedy disappears, prompting him to comment, "I must have blown him to smithereens"; he did so, as Speedy held onto the bullet all the way to the city limits of Smithereens. Speedy returns and shoves the bullet back up the gun, causing it to explode.

Daffy decides to try a less direct approach by disguising himself as a Mexican; Speedy is not fooled, however, and this fails. Next, he offers Speedy a drink of nitroglycerin, but the mouse lets it slide down the counter and explode (Daffy: "This is getting monotonous"). He then lures Speedy with a giant cheese on a mousetrap; the mouse sees this and takes it to Mexico. Daffy, not wanting to go with him, sneaks out and falls down a gorge. His next attempt involves shooting a cannon at Speedy, which also fails, as he is smashed into a canyon wall. When Speedy offers assistance, Daffy finally captures him.

He returns him to the Mayor, who gives him only fifty-six and a quarter cents, as he only worked an hour and a half. Daffy, enraged at having no tip, promptly releases Speedy. The Mayor beats Daffy up, and he is back on the streets begging again.

References

See also
List of American films of 1966
 List of Daffy Duck cartoons

Merrie Melodies short films
1966 films
1966 animated films
1966 short films
1966 comedy films
Daffy Duck films
Speedy Gonzales films
1960s Warner Bros. animated short films
1960s English-language films